Hirasawa Kurō (平澤九朗 1772-1840) was a Japanese samurai and potter during the late Edo period from Owari Province.  He produced Shino ware tea utensils using the potter's wheel.

His style was influenced by the tastes at the Owari Tokugawa court at Nagoya Castle which produced Ofukei ware. He was followed by a successor with the same name. One of his students was Masaki Sōzaburō.

References

External links 

Japanese potters
1772 births
1840 deaths